Nantasri is a surname. Notable people with the surname include:

 Wicha Nantasri (born 1986), Thai footballer
 Wichan Nantasri (born 1986), Thai footballer

Thai-language surnames